Bengasi  is a 1942 Italian war film directed by Augusto Genina and starring Fosco Giachetti, Maria von Tasnady and Amedeo Nazzari. The film was shot at Cinecittà in Rome. The film was a propaganda work, designed to support the Fascist regime of Benito Mussolini. It portrays Allied atrocities in "Bengasi Italiana", such as the murder of a peasant by a group of drunken Australian soldiers.

It was presented at the Venice Film Festival and won the Mussolini Cup as the best Italian film while Fosco Giachetti won the best actor award. It proved popular with audiences, and was re-released in 1955 with some new scenes added.

Plot
The film is set in 1941 during the Second World War, when the city of Benghazi in Italian-ruled Libya was occupied by British forces. Italian inhabitants of Benghazi work to resist the British and discover their military plans. One man, Filippo Colleoni, appears to be collaborating with the British but is in fact working undercover for Italian intelligence. The film ends with the city being recaptured by Italian troops and their Nazi German allies.

Main cast
Fosco Giachetti as Captain Enrico Berti
Maria De Tasnady as Carla Berti
Amedeo Nazzari as Filippo Colleoni
Vivi Gioi as Giuliana
Guido Notari as Italian podestà in Benghazi
Carlo Tamberlani as Giovanni Galassi
 as doctor Malpini
 as Maria ('Fanny')
Fedele Gentile as Antonio
Amelia Bissi as Giovanni's mother
Giorgio Costantini as General Robertson
Guglielmo Sinaz as Tropeoli
Carlo Duse as Captain Marchi
Pier Giorgio Heliczer as Sandrino Berti

References

External links

Summary

1940s war films
Italian war films
Films set in Libya
North African campaign films
Films directed by Augusto Genina
Italian black-and-white films
World War II propaganda films
Italian World War II films
Fascist propaganda
Films shot at Cinecittà Studios
1940s Italian films
Italian propaganda films